Maoritomella pleonastica is a species of sea snail, a marine gastropod mollusk in the family Borsoniidae.

Description
The height of the shell attains 10.9 mm, its width 4.1 mm.

Distribution
This marine species occurs off the Agulhas Bank, South Africa

References

 Barnard, K. H. 1958. Contributions to the knowledge of South African marine Mollusca. Part 1. Gastropoda: Prosobranchiata: Toxoglossa. Ann. S. Afr. Mus. 44: 73–163. 
 R.N. Kilburn, Turridae (Mollusca: Gastropoda) of southern Africa and Mozambique. Part 3. Subfamily Borsoniinae; Annals of the Natal Museum, 1986 - reference.sabinet.co.za

External links
 
  Bouchet P., Kantor Yu.I., Sysoev A. & Puillandre N. (2011) A new operational classification of the Conoidea. Journal of Molluscan Studies 77: 273–308

Endemic fauna of South Africa
pleonastica
Gastropods described in 1958